Osman Mirzayev (April 13, 1937 – November 20, 1991) was a journalist, writer and publicist in Soviet Azerbaijan, then part of the USSR. The journalist is the father of Sevinj Osmanqizi.

Osman Mirzayev is widely regarded as one of the great pioneers of independent journalism in Azerbaijan. He came to prominence as presenter of Dalga (Wave), Azerbaijan's first political TV programme, and through his investigative articles about political repression and persecution in the Soviet Azerbaijan and books We Only Live Once, Eagle in Flight, Drop and Lake and many other writings. Mirzayev's book Adlarimiz (Our Names) reviews the origins and meanings of the most popular first names in Azerbaijan.

Biography 
Osman Mirzayev was born on April 13, 1937 in Baku, Azerbaijan. He was the graduate of the Phylology Department of Azerbaijan State University.

After the country regained its independence in 1991, he rose to the position of Presidential Spokesman and Head of the Information Department of the Presidential Administration of the Azerbaijan Republic.

Osman Mirzayev was killed on November 20, 1991 Azerbaijani Mil Mi-8 shootdown in Nagorno Karabakh. He was part of a 22-person international mission to investigate clashes in the region. There were no survivors of the crash. He left a wife and three daughters, all engaged in journalism. Osman Mirzayev is buried at the Alley of Honor in Baku. There are streets and schools named after Osman Mirzayev in Azerbaijan.

Selected awards and honours
1993: National Hero of Azerbaijan (awarded post mortem)
1994: Honorary doctoral degree of the Azerbaijan State University
1985: The Golden Pen Award
1988: Honorary Journalist of Azerbaijan Republic

Authored Books 
 "Eagle in Flight":  (1978) 
 "Drop and Lake" (1979)
 "Our Names"(1986). Etymology and meaning of popular Azeri names.  Reprinted in 1994, and 2010.
 "We Only Live Once"'' (1991)

See also
1991 Azerbaijani Mil Mi-8 shootdown

References

External links
November 20 is the anniversary of the most tragic incident in the history of independence of Azerbaijan
Rafael Huseynov speech at COE
Азад Шариф "Творческие династии Азербайджана XX века"

1937 births
1991 deaths
Journalists from Baku
Political office-holders in Azerbaijan
Nagorno-Karabakh
People murdered in Azerbaijan
Deaths by firearm in Azerbaijan
Assassinated Azerbaijani journalists
Soviet Azerbaijani people
Burials at Alley of Honor
Victims of aircraft shootdowns
20th-century journalists